GrandOrgue is a free and open-source virtual pipe organ simulator, which utilizes the wxWidgets widget toolkit.

It was originally developed as MyOrgan, a free version of Hauptwerk 1, starting in 2006.  The original author transferred the copyrights to Milan Digital Audio in 2009. Its main developers are Lars Palo, Oleg Samarin and Denis Roussel. It has builds for Linux, Windows, and OS X.

GrandOrgue is the free alternative to Hauptwerk software, it is free to download and use. With GrandOrgue, a user may download virtual replicas of real organs around the world, called sample sets. Many free sample sets are available, mainly from Lars Palo and Piotr Grabowski, but there are also downloadable ODFs (organ definition files) for commercially available organs for Hauptwerk, such as the virtual organ of the Abbey in Caen.

References

External links
 GitHub project page
Lars Palo website
Piotr Grabowski website

Free and open-source software
Software that uses wxWidgets
Free music software